A Great Coup is a 1919 British silent sports film directed by George Dewhurst and Walter West and starring Stewart Rome, Poppy Wyndham and Gregory Scott. It was based on a novel by Nat Gould. The film is about a racehorse owner who decides to race his best horse in a major race meeting after his jockey is nobbled by the opposition.

Cast
 Stewart Rome - Squire Hampton 
 Poppy Wyndham - Kate Hampton 
 Gregory Scott - Reid Gordon 
 Cameron Carr - Richard Foxton

References

Bibliography
 Low, Rachael. The History of British Film, Volume 4 1918-1929. Routledge, 1997.

External links

1919 films
British silent feature films
1910s sports films
Films directed by George Dewhurst
Films directed by Walter West
British horse racing films
British black-and-white films
1910s English-language films
1910s British films
Silent sports films